A metallopharmaceutical is a drug that contains a metal as an active ingredient. Most commonly metallopharmaceuticals are used as anticancer or antimicrobial agents. The efficiency of metallopharmaceuticals is crucially dependent on the respective trace metal binding forms.

Examples of metallopharmaceuticals include:

 bismuth subsalicylate – a mild anti-diarrheal also used in treating peptic ulcers caused by antibiotic-resistant H. pylori
 cisplatin and carboplatin – platinum containing anticancer agents
 gold salts such as auranofin – anti-inflammatory for treatment of arthritis
 silver sulfadiazine – antibacterial
 zinc pyrithione – antibacterial and antifungal

References

Further reading 

 
 
 
 
 

Drugs
Anti-infective agents